Trostnitsa is a rural locality (a khutor) in Prilepsky Selsoviet Rural Settlement, Konyshyovsky District, Kursk Oblast, Russia. Population:

Geography 
The khutor is located in the Prutishche River basin (in the basin of the Seym), 60 km from the Russia–Ukraine border, 62.5 km west of Kursk, 3 km south of the district center – the urban-type settlement Konyshyovka, 4.5 km from the selsoviet center – Prilepy.

 Climate
Trostnitsa has a warm-summer humid continental climate (Dfb in the Köppen climate classification).

Transport 
Trostnitsa is located 57 km from the federal route  Ukraine Highway, 46 km from the route  Crimea Highway, 43 km from the route  (Trosna – M3 highway), 28 km from the road of regional importance  (Fatezh – Dmitriyev), 1.5 km from the road  (Konyshyovka – Zhigayevo – 38K-038), 2.5 km from the road  (Lgov – Konyshyovka), 1 km from the road of intermunicipal significance  (38K-005 – Zakharkovo), 2.5 km from the nearest railway halt 565 km (railway line Navlya – Lgov-Kiyevsky).

The rural locality is situated 68 km from Kursk Vostochny Airport, 157 km from Belgorod International Airport and 271 km from Voronezh Peter the Great Airport.

References

Notes

Sources

Rural localities in Konyshyovsky District